Presbyterianism is a part of the Reformed tradition within Protestantism that broke from the Roman Catholic Church. Presbyterian churches derive their name from the presbyterian form of church government by representative assemblies of elders. Many Reformed churches are organised this way, but the word Presbyterian, when capitalized, is often applied to churches that trace their roots to the Church of Scotland or to English Dissenter groups that formed during the English Civil War.

Presbyterian theology typically emphasizes the sovereignty of God, the authority of the Scriptures, and the necessity of grace through faith in Christ. Presbyterian church government was ensured in Scotland by the Acts of Union in 1707, which created the Kingdom of Great Britain. In fact, most Presbyterians found in England can trace a Scottish connection, and the Presbyterian denomination was also taken to North America, mostly by Scots and Scotch-Irish immigrants. The Presbyterian denominations in Scotland hold to the Reformed theology of John Calvin and his immediate successors, although there is a range of theological views within contemporary Presbyterianism. Local congregations of churches which use Presbyterian polity are governed by sessions made up of representatives of the congregation (elders); a conciliar approach which is found at other levels of decision-making (presbytery, synod, and general assembly). There are roughly 75 million Presbyterians in the world.

The roots of Presbyterianism lie in the Reformation of the 16th century, the example of John Calvin's Republic of Geneva being particularly influential. Most Reformed churches that trace their history back to Scotland are either presbyterian or congregationalist in government. In the twentieth century, some Presbyterians played an important role in the ecumenical movement, including the World Council of Churches. Many Presbyterian denominations have found ways of working together with other Reformed denominations and Christians of other traditions, especially in the World Communion of Reformed Churches. Some Presbyterian churches have entered into unions with other churches, such as Congregationalists, Lutherans, Anglicans, and Methodists. Presbyterians in the United States came largely from Scottish immigrants, Scots-Irish immigrants, and also from New England Yankee communities that had originally been Congregational but changed because of an agreed-upon Plan of Union of 1801 for frontier areas.

Presbyterian identity

Early history

Presbyterian tradition, particularly that of the Church of Scotland, traces its early roots to the Christian Church founded by Saint Columba, through the 6th century Hiberno-Scottish mission. Tracing their apostolic origin to Saint John, the Culdees practised Christian monasticism, a key feature of Celtic Christianity in the region, with a presbyter exercising "authority within the institution, while the different monastic institutions were independent of one another." The Church in Scotland kept the Christian feast of Easter at a date different from the See of Rome and its monks used a unique style of tonsure. The Synod of Whitby in 664, however, ended these distinctions as it ruled "that Easter would be celebrated according to the Roman date, not the Celtic date." Although Roman influence came to dominate the Church in Scotland, certain Celtic influences remained in the Scottish Church, such as "the singing of metrical psalms, many of them set to old Celtic Christianity Scottish traditional and folk tunes", which later became a "distinctive part of Scottish Presbyterian worship".

Development

Presbyterian history is part of the history of Christianity, but the beginning of Presbyterianism as a distinct movement occurred during the 16th-century Protestant Reformation. As the Catholic Church resisted the Reformers, several different theological movements splintered from the Church and bore different denominations. Presbyterianism was especially influenced by the French theologian John Calvin, who is credited with the development of Reformed theology, and the work of John Knox, a Scottish Catholic Priest who studied with Calvin in Geneva. He brought back Reformed teachings to Scotland. The Presbyterian church traces its ancestry back primarily to Scotland. In August 1560, the Parliament of Scotland adopted the Scots Confession as the creed of the Scottish Kingdom. In December 1560, the First Book of Discipline was published, outlining important doctrinal issues but also establishing regulations for church government, including the creation of ten ecclesiastical districts with appointed superintendents which later became known as presbyteries.

In time, the Scots Confession would be supplanted by the Westminster Confession of Faith, and the larger and shorter catechisms, which were formulated by the Westminster Assembly between 1643 and 1649.

Characteristics
Presbyterians distinguish themselves from other denominations by doctrine, institutional organisation (or "church order") and worship; often using a "Book of Order" to regulate common practice and order. The origins of the Presbyterian churches are in Calvinism. Many branches of Presbyterianism are remnants of previous splits from larger groups. Some of the splits have been due to doctrinal controversy, while some have been caused by disagreement concerning the degree to which those ordained to church office should be required to agree with the Westminster Confession of Faith, which historically serves as an important confessional document – second only to the Bible, yet directing particularities in the standardisation and translation of the Bible – in Presbyterian churches.

Presbyterians place great importance upon education and lifelong learning, tempered with the belief that no human action can affect salvation.

Continuous study of the scriptures, theological writings, and understanding and interpretation of church doctrine are embodied in several statements of faith and catechisms formally adopted by various branches of the church, often referred to as "subordinate standards".

When the women with Eliza Thompson gathered to pray at a Presbyterian church in Hillsboro, Ohio, this became the birthplace of the highly influential Woman’s Temperance Crusade. Presbyterian evangelist Billy Sunday also persuaded many thousands who drank to turn to Christ instead – wanting Christ now and no more alcohol.

Government

Presbyterian government is by councils (still known as courts in some countries, as boards in others) of elders. Teaching and ruling elders are ordained and convene in the lowest council known as a session or consistory responsible for the discipline, nurture, and mission of the local congregation. Teaching elders (pastors or ministers) have responsibility for teaching, worship, and performing sacraments. Pastors or ministers are called by individual congregations. A congregation issues a call for the pastor or minister's service, but this call must be ratified by the local presbytery. The pastor or minister is a teaching elder, and Moderator of the Session, but is not usually a member of the congregation; instead, this person is a member of the Presbytery of which the given church is a member.

Ruling elders are men or women who are elected by the congregation and ordained to serve with the teaching elders, assuming responsibility for the nurture and leadership of the congregation. Often, especially in larger congregations, the elders delegate the practicalities of buildings, finance, and temporal ministry to the needy in the congregation to a distinct group of officers (sometimes called deacons, which are ordained in some denominations). This group may variously be known as a "Deacon Board", "Board of Deacons" "Diaconate", or "Deacons' Court". These are sometimes known as "presbyters" to the full congregation.

Above the sessions exist presbyteries, which have area responsibilities. These are composed of teaching elders and ruling elders from each of the constituent congregations. The presbytery sends representatives to a broader regional or national assembly, generally known as the General Assembly, although an intermediate level of a synod sometimes exists. This congregation / presbytery / synod / general assembly schema is based on the historical structure of the larger Presbyterian churches, such as the Church of Scotland or the Presbyterian Church (U.S.A.); some bodies, such as the Presbyterian Church in America and the Presbyterian Church in Ireland, skip one of the steps between congregation and General Assembly, and usually the step skipped is the Synod. The Church of Scotland abolished the Synod in 1993.

Presbyterian governance is practiced by Presbyterian denominations and also by many other Reformed churches.

Doctrine 

Presbyterianism is historically a confessional tradition. This has two implications. The obvious one is that confessional churches express their faith in the form of "confessions of faith," which have some level of authoritative status. However this is based on a more subtle point: In confessional churches, theology is not solely an individual matter. While individuals are encouraged to understand Scripture, and may challenge the current institutional understanding, theology is carried out by the community as a whole. It is this community understanding of theology that is expressed in confessions.

However, there has arisen a spectrum of approaches to confessionalism. The manner of subscription, or the degree to which the official standards establish the actual doctrine of the church, is a practical matter. That is, the decisions rendered in ordination and in the courts of the church largely determine what the church means, representing the whole, by its adherence to the doctrinal standard.

Some Presbyterian traditions adopt only the Westminster Confession of Faith as the doctrinal standard to which teaching elders are required to subscribe, in contrast to the Larger and Shorter catechisms, which are approved for use in instruction. Many Presbyterian denominations, especially in North America, have adopted all of the Westminster Standards as their standard of doctrine which is subordinate to the Bible. These documents are Calvinistic in their doctrinal orientation. The Presbyterian Church in Canada retains the Westminster Confession of Faith in its original form, while admitting the historical period in which it was written should be understood when it is read.

The Westminster Confession is "The principal subordinate standard of the Church of Scotland" but "with due regard to liberty of opinion in points which do not enter into the substance of the Faith" (V). This formulation represents many years of struggle over the extent to which the confession reflects the Word of God and the struggle of conscience of those who came to believe it did not fully do so (e.g. William Robertson Smith). Some Presbyterian Churches, such as the Free Church of Scotland, have no such "conscience clause".

The Presbyterian Church (U.S.A.) has adopted the Book of Confessions, which reflects the inclusion of other Reformed confessions in addition to the Westminster Standards. These other documents include ancient creedal statements (the Nicene Creed, the Apostles' Creed), 16th-century Reformed confessions (the Scots Confession, the Heidelberg Catechism, the Second Helvetic Confession), and 20th century documents (The Theological Declaration of Barmen, Confession of 1967 and A Brief Statement of Faith).

The Presbyterian Church in Canada developed the confessional document Living Faith (1984) and retains it as a subordinate standard of the denomination. It is confessional in format, yet like the Westminster Confession, draws attention back to original Bible text.

Presbyterians in Ireland who rejected Calvinism and the Westminster Confessions formed the Non-subscribing Presbyterian Church of Ireland.  

John Gresham Machen, the prominent Presbyterian theologian and Professor of New Testament at Princeton Seminary between 1906 and 1929, led a revolt against modernist doctrine in his Christianity and Liberalism (1923) that critiqued theological modernism. He argued that modernism and liberal theology was a false religion, a pretender that cloaks itself in Christian language – "Liberalism". This religion is a marriage of naturalism, humanism, secularism, and sentimentalism all rolled into one.

Worship and sacraments

Worship

Presbyterian denominations that trace their heritage to the British Isles usually organise their church services inspired by the principles in the Directory of Public Worship, developed by the Westminster Assembly in the 1640s. This directory documented Reformed worship practices and theology adopted and developed over the preceding century by British Puritans, initially guided by John Calvin and John Knox. It was enacted as law by the Scottish Parliament, and became one of the foundational documents of Presbyterian church legislation elsewhere.

Historically, the driving principle in the development of the standards of Presbyterian worship is the Regulative principle of worship, which specifies that (in worship), what is not commanded is forbidden.

Over subsequent centuries, many Presbyterian churches modified these prescriptions by introducing hymnody, instrumental accompaniment, and ceremonial vestments into worship. However, there is not one fixed  "Presbyterian" worship style. Although there are set services for the Lord's Day in keeping with first-day Sabbatarianism, one can find a service to be evangelical and even revivalist in tone (especially in some conservative denominations), or strongly liturgical, approximating the practices of Lutheranism or more of Anglicanism (especially where Scottish tradition is esteemed), or semi-formal, allowing for a balance of hymns, preaching, and congregational participation (favored by many American Presbyterians). Most Presbyterian churches follow the traditional liturgical year and observe the traditional holidays, holy seasons, such as Advent, Christmas, Ash Wednesday, Holy Week, Easter, Pentecost, etc. They also make use of the appropriate seasonal liturgical colors, etc. Many incorporate ancient liturgical prayers and responses into the communion services and follow a daily, seasonal, and festival lectionary. Other Presbyterians, however, such as the Reformed Presbyterians, would practice a cappella exclusive psalmody, as well as eschew the celebration of holy days.

Among the paleo-orthodox and emerging church movements in Protestant and evangelical churches, in which some Presbyterians are involved, clergy are moving away from the traditional black Geneva gown to such vestments as the alb and chasuble, but also cassock and surplice (typically a full-length Old English style surplice which resembles the Celtic alb, an ungirdled liturgical tunic of the old Gallican Rite), which some, particularly those identifying with the Liturgical Renewal Movement, hold to be more ancient and representative of a more ecumenical past.

Sacraments

Presbyterians traditionally have held the Worship position that there are only two sacraments:
 Baptism, in which they baptize infants, as well as unbaptized adults by the Aspersion (sprinkling) or Affusion (pouring) method in the name of the Father and of the Son and of the Holy Spirit, rather than the Immersion method.
 The Lord's Supper (also known as Communion), in which Presbyterians believe in the Real Presence of Christ (pneumatic presence) in the spiritual sense, in the bread and wine through the Holy Spirit, as opposed to being locally present as in transubstantiation or consubstantiation.

Architecture

Some early Presbyterians, which were influenced by the puritan movement, were careful to distinguish between the "church," which referred to the members, and the "meeting house," which was the building in which the church met. Until the late 19th century, very few Presbyterians ever referred to their buildings as "churches." Presbyterians believed that meeting-houses (now called churches) are buildings to support the worship of God. The decor in some instances was austere so as not to detract from worship. Early Presbyterian meeting-houses were extremely plain. No stained glass, no elaborate furnishings, and no images were to be found in the meeting-house. The pulpit, often raised so as only to be accessible by a staircase, was the centerpiece of the building. But these were not the standard characteristics of the mainline Presbyterians. These were more of the wave of Presbyterians that were influenced by the Puritans.

In the late 19th century a gradual shift began to occur. Prosperous congregations built imposing churches, such as Fourth Presbyterian Church of Chicago, Brick Presbyterian Church in New York City, Shadyside Presbyterian Church in Pennsylvania, St Stephen Presbyterian in Fort Worth, Texas, and many others.

Usually a Presbyterian church will not have statues of saints, nor the ornate altar more typical of a Roman Catholic church. Instead, there is a "communion table," usually on the same level as the congregation, and sometimes elevated similar to an altar, however surrounded by the chancel. There may be a rail between the communion table and the chancel behind it, which may contain a more decorative altar-type table, choir loft, or choir stalls, lectern and clergy area. The altar is called the communion table, and the altar area is called the chancel by Presbyterians. In Presbyterian, and in Reformed churches, there may be an altar cross, either on the communion table or on a table in the chancel. By using the "empty" cross, or cross of the Westminster/Celtic cross, Presbyterians emphasize the resurrection and that Christ is not continually dying, but died once and is alive for all eternity. Quite a few Presbyterian church buildings are decorated with a cross, that has a circle around the center, or Celtic cross. This not only emphasizes the resurrection, but also acknowledges historical aspects of Presbyterianism. A baptismal font will be located either at the entrance or near the chancel area. Presbyterian architecture generally makes significant use of symbolism. One may also find decorative and ornate stained glass windows depicting scenes from the Bible. Some Presbyterian churches will also have ornate statues of Christ or graven scenes from the Last Supper located behind the chancel. St. Giles' Cathedral in Scotland has a crucifix next to an ornate elevated communion table that hangs alongside. The image of Christ is more of a faint image, with a more modern design.

By region

Europe

Scotland
John Knox (1505–1572), a Scot who had spent time studying under Calvin in Geneva, returned to Scotland and urged his countrymen to reform the Church in line with Calvinist doctrines. After a period of religious convulsion and political conflict culminating in a victory for the Protestant party at the Siege of Leith the authority of the Catholic Church was abolished in favour of Reformation by the legislation of the Scottish Reformation Parliament in 1560. The Church was eventually organised by Andrew Melville along Presbyterian lines to become the national Church of Scotland. King James VI and I moved the Church of Scotland towards an episcopal form of government, and in 1637, James' successor, Charles I and William Laud, the Archbishop of Canterbury, attempted to force the Church of Scotland to use the Book of Common Prayer. What resulted was an armed insurrection, with many Scots signing the Solemn League and Covenant. The Covenanters would serve as the government of Scotland for nearly a decade, and would also send military support to the Parliamentarians during the English Civil War. Following the restoration of the monarchy in 1660, Charles II, despite the initial support that he received from the Covenanters, reinstated an episcopal form of government on the church.

However, with the Glorious Revolution of 1688 the Church of Scotland was unequivocally recognised as a Presbyterian institution by the monarch due to Scottish Presbyterian support for the aforementioned revolution and the Acts of Union 1707 between Scotland and England guaranteed the Church of Scotland's form of government. However, legislation by the United Kingdom parliament allowing patronage led to splits in the Church. In 1733, a group of ministers seceded from the Church of Scotland to form the Associate Presbytery, another group seceded in 1761 to form the Relief Church and the Disruption of 1843 led to the formation of the Free Church of Scotland. Further splits took place, especially over theological issues, but most Presbyterians in Scotland were reunited by 1929 union of the established Church of Scotland and the United Free Church of Scotland.

There are now eight Presbyterian denominations in Scotland today. These are, in order of size: the Church of Scotland, the Free Church of Scotland, the United Free Church of Scotland, the Free Presbyterian Church of Scotland, the Free Church of Scotland (Continuing), the Associated Presbyterian Church, the Reformed Presbyterian Church of Scotland, and the International Presbyterian Church. Combined, they have over 1500 congregations in Scotland.

Within Scotland the term 'kirk' is usually used to refer to a local Presbyterian church. Informally, the term 'The Kirk' refers to the Church of Scotland. Some of the values and ideals espoused in Scottish Presbyterian denominations can be reflected in this reference in a book from Norman Drummond, chaplain to the Queen in Scotland.

England

In England, Presbyterianism was established in secret in 1592. Thomas Cartwright is thought to be the first Presbyterian in England. Cartwright's controversial lectures at Cambridge University condemning the episcopal hierarchy of the Elizabethan Church led to his deprivation of his post by Archbishop John Whitgift and his emigration abroad. Between 1645 and 1648, a series of ordinances of the Long Parliament established Presbyterianism as the polity of the Church of England. Presbyterian government was established in London and Lancashire and in a few other places in England, although Presbyterian hostility to the execution of Charles I and the establishment of the republican Commonwealth of England meant that Parliament never enforced the Presbyterian system in England. The Restoration of the monarchy in 1660 brought the return of Episcopal church government in England (and in Scotland for a short time); but the Presbyterian church in England continued in Non-Conformity, outside of the established church. In 1719 a major split, the Salter's Hall controversy, occurred; with the majority siding with nontrinitarian views. Thomas Bradbury published several sermons bearing on the controversy, and in 1719, "An answer to the reproaches cast on the dissenting ministers who subscribed their belief of the Eternal Trinity." By the 18th century many English Presbyterian congregations had become Unitarian in doctrine.

A number of new Presbyterian Churches were founded by Scottish immigrants to England in the 19th century and later. Following the 'Disruption' in 1843 many of those linked to the Church of Scotland eventually joined what became the Presbyterian Church of England in 1876. Some, such as Crown Court (Covent Garden, London), St Andrew's (Stepney, London) and Swallow Street (London), did not join the English denomination, which is why there are Church of Scotland congregations in England such as those at Crown Court, and St Columba's, Pont Street (Knightsbridge) in London. There is also a congregation in the heart of London's financial district called London City Presbyterian Church that is affiliated with the Free Church of Scotland.

In 1972, the Presbyterian Church of England (PCofE) united with the Congregational Church in England and Wales to form the United Reformed Church (URC). Among the congregations the PCofE brought to the URC were Tunley (Lancashire), Aston Tirrold (Oxfordshire) and John Knox Presbyterian Church, Stepney, London (now part of Stepney Meeting House URC) – these are among the sole survivors today of the English Presbyterian churches of the 17th century. The URC also has a presence in Scotland, mostly of former Congregationalist Churches. Two former Presbyterian congregations, St Columba's, Cambridge (founded in 1879), and St Columba's, Oxford (founded as a chaplaincy by the PCofE and the Church of Scotland in 1908 and as a congregation of the PCofE in 1929), continue as congregations of the URC and university chaplaincies of the Church of Scotland.

In recent years a number of smaller denominations adopting Presbyterian forms of church government have organised in England, including the International Presbyterian Church planted by evangelical theologian Francis Schaeffer of the L'Abri Fellowship in the 1970s, and the Evangelical Presbyterian Church in England and Wales founded in the North of England in the late 1980s.

Wales
In Wales, Presbyterianism is represented by the Presbyterian Church of Wales, which was originally composed largely of Calvinistic Methodists who accepted Calvinist theology rather than the Arminianism of the Wesleyan Methodists. They broke off from the Church of England in 1811, ordaining their own ministers. They were originally known as the Calvinist Methodist connexion and in the 1920s it became alternatively known as the Presbyterian Church of Wales.

Ireland

Presbyterianism is the largest Protestant denomination in Northern Ireland and the second largest on the island of Ireland (after the Anglican Church of Ireland), and was brought by Scottish plantation settlers to Ulster who had been strongly encouraged to emigrate by James VI of Scotland, also James I of Ireland and England. An estimated 100,000 Scottish Presbyterians moved to the northern counties of Ireland between 1607 and the Battle of the Boyne in 1690. The Presbytery of Ulster was formed in 1642 separately from the established Anglican Church. Presbyterians, along with Roman Catholics in Ulster and the rest of Ireland, suffered under the discriminatory Penal Laws until they were revoked in the early 19th century. Presbyterianism is represented in Ireland by the Presbyterian Church in Ireland, the Non-subscribing Presbyterian Church of Ireland, the Free Presbyterian Church of Ulster, the Reformed Presbyterian Church of Ireland and the Evangelical Presbyterian Church.

France
There is a Church of Scotland (Presbyterian) in central Paris: The Scots Kirk, which is English-speaking, and is attended by many nationalities. It maintains close links with the Church of Scotland in Scotland itself, as well as with the Reformed Church of France.

Italy

The Waldensian Evangelical Church (Chiesa Evangelica Valdese, CEV) is an Italian Protestant denomination.
The church was founded in the 12th century, and centuries later, after the Protestant Reformation, it adhered to Calvinist theology and became the Italian branch of the Presbyterian churches. As such, the church is a member of the World Communion of Reformed Churches.

North America

Even before Presbyterianism spread with immigrants abroad from Scotland, there were divisions in the larger Presbyterian family. Some later rejoined only to separate again. In what some interpret as rueful self-reproach, some Presbyterians refer to the divided Presbyterian churches as the "Split Ps".

United States

Presbyterianism first officially arrived in Colonial America in 1644 with the establishment of Christ's First Presbyterian Church in Hempstead, New York. The Church was organized by the Rev. Richard Denton.

In 1703 the first Presbytery in Philadelphia was established. In time, the presbytery would be joined by two more to form a synod (1717) and would eventually evolve into the Presbyterian Church in the United States of America in 1789. The nation's largest Presbyterian denomination, the Presbyterian Church (U.S.A.) – PC (USA) – can trace its heritage back to the original PCUSA, as can the Presbyterian Church in America (PCA), the Orthodox Presbyterian Church (OPC), the Bible Presbyterian Church (BPC), the Cumberland Presbyterian Church (CPC), the Cumberland Presbyterian Church in America, the Evangelical Presbyterian Church (EPC), and the Evangelical Covenant Order of Presbyterians (ECO).

Other Presbyterian bodies in the United States include the Reformed Presbyterian Church of North America (RPCNA), the Associate Reformed Presbyterian Church (ARP), the Reformed Presbyterian Church in the United States (RPCUS), the Reformed Presbyterian Church General Assembly, the Reformed Presbyterian Church – Hanover Presbytery, the Covenant Presbyterian Church, the Presbyterian Reformed Church, the Westminster Presbyterian Church in the United States, the Korean American Presbyterian Church, and the Free Presbyterian Church of North America.

The territory within about a  radius of Charlotte, North Carolina, is historically the greatest concentration of Presbyterianism in the Southern United States, while an almost identical geographic area around Pittsburgh, Pennsylvania, contains probably the largest number of Presbyterians in the entire nation.

The PC (USA), beginning with its predecessor bodies, has, in common with other so-called "mainline" Protestant denominations, experienced a significant decline in members in recent years. Some estimates have placed that loss at nearly half in the last forty years.

Presbyterian influence, especially through Princeton theology, can be traced in modern Evangelicalism. Balmer says that:

In the late 1800s, Presbyterian missionaries established a presence in what is now northern New Mexico. This provided an alternative to the Catholicism, which was brought to the area by the Spanish Conquistadors and had remained unchanged. The area experienced a "mini" reformation, in that many converts were made to Presbyterianism, prompting persecution. In some cases, the converts left towns and villages to establish their own neighboring villages. The arrival of the United States to the area prompted the Catholic church to modernize and make efforts at winning the converts back, many of which did return. However, there are still stalwart Presbyterians and Presbyterian churches in the area.

Historically, along with Lutherans and Episcopalians, Presbyterians tend to be considerably wealthier and are better educated (having more graduate and post-graduate degrees per capita) than most other religious groups in United States; a group known as White Anglo-Saxon Protestants (WASPs), they are disproportionately represented in the upper reaches of American business, law, and politics.

Canada

In Canada, the largest Presbyterian denomination – and indeed the largest Protestant denomination – was the Presbyterian Church in Canada, formed in 1875 with the merger of four regional groups. In 1925, the United Church of Canada was formed by the majority of Presbyterians combining with the Methodist Church, Canada, and the Congregational Union of Canada. A sizable minority of Canadian Presbyterians, primarily in southern Ontario but also throughout the entire nation, withdrew, and reconstituted themselves as a non-concurring continuing Presbyterian body. They regained use of the original name in 1939.

Latin America

Presbyterianism arrived in Latin America in the 19th century.

Mexico 
The biggest Presbyterian church is the National Presbyterian Church in Mexico (Iglesia Nacional Presbiteriana de México), which has around 2,500,000 members and associates and 3000 congregations, but there are other small denominations like the Associate Reformed Presbyterian Church in Mexico which was founded in 1875 by the Associate Reformed Church in North America. The Independent Presbyterian Church, the Presbyterian Reformed Church in Mexico, and the National Conservative Presbyterian Church in Mexico are existing churches in the Reformed tradition.

Brazil 
In Brazil, the Presbyterian Church of Brazil (Igreja Presbiteriana do Brasil) totals approximately 1,011,300 members; other Presbyterian churches (Independents, United, Conservatives, Renovated, etc.) in this nation have around 350,000 members. The Renewed Presbyterian Church in Brazil was influenced by the charismatic movement and has about 131 000 members as of 2011. The Conservative Presbyterian Church was founded in 1940 and has eight presbyteries. The Fundamentalist Presbyterian church in Brazil was influenced by Karl McIntire and the Bible Presbyterian church USA and has around 1 800 members. The Independent Presbyterian Church in Brasil was founded in 1903 by pastor Pereira, has 500 congregations and 75 000 members. The United Presbyterian Church in Brazil has around 4 000 members. There are also ethnic Korean Presbyterian churches in the country. The Evangelical Reformed Church in Brazil has Dutch origin. The Reformed Churches in Brazil were recently founded by the Canadian Reformed Churches with the Reformed Church in the Netherlands (liberated).

Congregational churches present in the country are also part of the Calvinistic tradition in Latin America.

Other Latin American states 
There are probably more than four million members of Presbyterian churches in all of Latin America. Presbyterian churches are also present in Peru, Bolivia, Cuba, Trinidad and Tobago, Venezuela, Colombia, Chile, Paraguay, Costa Rica, Nicaragua, Argentina, Honduras and others, but with few members. The Presbyterian Church in Belize has 17 churches and church plants and there is a Reformed Seminary founded in 2004. Some Latin Americans in North America are active in the Presbyterian Cursillo Movement.

Africa

Presbyterianism arrived in Africa in the 19th century through the work of Scottish missionaries and founded churches such as St Michael and All Angels Church, Blantyre, Malawi. The church has grown extensively and now has a presence in at least 23 countries in the region.

African Presbyterian churches often incorporate diaconal ministries, including social services, emergency relief, and the operation of mission hospitals.  A number of partnerships exist between presbyteries in Africa and the PC(USA), including specific connections with Lesotho, Cameroon, Malawi, South Africa, Ghana and Zambia.  For example, the Lackawanna Presbytery, located in Northeastern Pennsylvania, has a partnership with a presbytery in Ghana.  Also the Southminster Presbyterian Church, located near Pittsburgh, has partnerships with churches in Malawi and Kenya. The Presbyterian Church of Nigeria, western Africa is also healthy and strong in mostly the southern states of this nation, strong density in the south-eastern states of this country. Beginning from Cross River state, the nearby coastal states, Rivers state, Lagos state to Ebonyi and Abia States. Hope Waddel's missionary expedition in the mid 19th century, and later Mary Slessor's stay in this coastal regions of the then British colony has brought about the beginning and the flourishing of this church in these areas.

Kenya
The Presbyterian Church of East Africa, based in Kenya, is particularly strong, with 500 clergy and 4 million members.

Malawi 
The Reformed Presbyterian Church in Malawi has 150 congregations and 17 000–20 000 members.  It was a mission of the Free Presbyterian church of Scotland. The Restored Reformed Church works with RPCM. Evangelical Presbyterian Church in Malawi is an existing small church. Part of the Presbyterian Church in Malawi and Zambia is known as CCAP, Church of Central Africa-Presbyterian. Often the churches there have one main congregation and a number of prayer houses develop. Education, health ministries, and worship and spiritual development are important.

Southern Africa
Southern Africa is a major base of Reformed and Presbyterian Churches.

Northern Africa
 The Presbyterian Church of South Sudan and Sudan, founded in 1902 by American missionaries in Malakal, was deprived of foreign pastors since 1962 by decision of the Sudanese government but it continued to grow. It is now the 3rd largest Christian church in Sudan with 1,000,000 members, now shared between Sudan and South Sudan.
 The Presbyterian Evangelical Church of Sudan was founded in the north of the country and in Khartoum by the same American missionaries in the late 19th century but left under the guidance of Egyptian evangelical pastors of Coptic origin.
In addition, there are a number of Presbyterian Churches in north Africa, the most known is the Nile Synod in Egypt and a recently founded synod for Sudan.

Asia

Hong Kong 
The Hong Kong Council of the Church of Christ in China (CCC) is a uniting church formed by Presbyterians and Congregationalists, which inherited the Reformed tradition. HKCCCC is also the only mainline Reformed church in Hong Kong.

Cumberland Presbyterian Church Yao Dao Secondary School is a Presbyterian school in Yuen Long, New Territories. The Cumberland Presbyterian Church also have a church on the island of Cheung Chau. There are also Korean Christians resident in Hong Kong who are Presbyterians.

South Korea

Presbyterian Churches are the biggest and by far the most influential Protestant denominations in South Korea, with close to 20,000 churches affiliated with the two largest Presbyterian denominations in the country. In South Korea there are 9 million Presbyterians, forming the majority of the 15 million Korean Protestants. In South Korea there are 100 different Presbyterian denominations.

Most of the Korean Presbyterian denominations share the same name in Korean, 대한예수교장로회 (literally means the Presbyterian Church of Korea or PCK), tracing its roots to the United Presbyterian Assembly before its long history of disputes and schisms. The Presbyterian schism began with the controversy in relation to the Japanese shrine worship enforced during the Japanese colonial period and the establishment of a minor division (Koryu-pa, 고려파, later The Koshin Presbyterian Church in Korea, Koshin 고신) in 1952. And in 1953 the second schism happened when the theological orientation of the Chosun Seminary (later Hanshin University) founded in 1947 could not be tolerated in the PCK and another minor group (The Presbyterian Church in the Republic of Korea, Kijang, 기장) was separated. The last major schism had to do with the issue of whether the PCK should join the WCC. The controversy divided the PCK into two denominations, The Presbyterian Church of Korea (Tonghap, 통합) and The General Assembly of Presbyterian Church in Korea (Hapdong, 합동) in 1959.  All major seminaries associated with each denomination claim heritage from the Pyung Yang Theological Seminary, therefore, not only Presbyterian University and Theological Seminary and Chongsin University which are related to PCK but also Hanshin University of PROK all celebrated the 100th class in 2007, 100 years from the first graduates of Pyung Yang Theological Seminary.

Korean Presbyterian denominations are active in evangelism and many of its missionaries are being sent overseas, being the second biggest missionary sender in the world after the United States. GMS, the missionary body of the "Hapdong" General Assembly of Presbyterian Churches of Korea, is the single largest Presbyterian missionary organization in Korea.
In addition there are many Korean-American Presbyterians in the United States, either with their own church sites or sharing space in pre-existing churches as is the case in Australia, New Zealand and even Muslim countries such as Saudi Arabia with Korean immigration.

The Korean Presbyterian Church started through the mission of the Presbyterian Church (USA) and the Australian Presbyterian theological tradition is central to the United States. But after independence, the 'Presbyterian Church in Korea (KoRyuPa)' advocated a Dutch Reformed position. In the 21st century, a new General Assembly of the Orthodox Presbyterian Church of Korea (Founder. Ha Seung-moo) in 2012 declared itself an authentic historical succession of Scottish Presbyterian John Knox.

Taiwan
The Presbyterian Church in Taiwan (PCT) is by far the largest Protestant denomination in Taiwan, with some 238,372 members as of 2009 (including a majority of the island's aborigines). English Presbyterian Missionary James Laidlaw Maxwell established the first Presbyterian church in Tainan in 1865. His colleague George Leslie Mackay, of the Canadian Presbyterian Mission, was active in Tamsui and north Taiwan from 1872 to 1901; he founded the island's first university and hospital, and created a written script for Taiwanese Minnan. The English and Canadian missions joined as the PCT in 1912. One of the few churches permitted to operate in Taiwan through the era of Japanese rule (1895–1945), the PCT experienced rapid growth during the era of Kuomintang-imposed martial law (1949–1987), in part due to its support for democracy, human rights, and Taiwan independence. Former ROC president Lee Teng-hui (in office 1988–2000) was a Presbyterian.

India

In the mainly Christian Indian state of Mizoram, Presbyterianism is the largest of all Christian denominations. It was brought there by missionaries from Wales in 1897. Prior to Mizoram, Welsh Presbyterians started venturing into the northeast India through the Khasi Hills (now in the state of Meghalaya in India) and established Presbyterian churches all over the Khasi Hills from the 1840s onwards. Hence, there is a strong presence of Presbyterians in Shillong (the present capital of Meghalaya) and the areas adjoining it. The Welsh missionaries built their first church in Sohra (aka Cherrapunji) in 1846. The Presbyterian church in India was integrated in 1970 into the United Church of Northern India (originally formed in 1924). It is the largest Presbyterian denomination in India.

Oceania

Australia

In Australia, Presbyterianism is the fourth largest denomination of Christianity, with nearly 600,000 Australians claiming to be Presbyterian in the 2006 Commonwealth Census. Presbyterian churches were founded in each colony, some with links to the Church of Scotland and others to the Free Church. There were also congregations originating from United Presbyterian Church of Scotland as well as a number founded by John Dunmore Lang. Most of these bodies merged between 1859 and 1870, and in 1901 formed a federal union called the Presbyterian Church of Australia but retaining their state assemblies. The Presbyterian Church of Eastern Australia representing the Free Church of Scotland tradition, and congregations in Victoria of the Reformed Presbyterian Church, originally from Ireland, are the other existing denominations dating from colonial times.

In 1977, two-thirds of the Presbyterian Church of Australia, along with most of the Congregational Union of Australia and all the Methodist Church of Australasia, combined to form the Uniting Church in Australia. The third who did not unite had various reasons for so acting, often cultural attachment but often conservative theological or social views. The permission for the ordination of women given in 1974 was rescinded in 1991 without affecting the two or three existing woman ministers. The approval of women elders given in the 1960s has been rescinded in all states except New South Wales, which has the largest membership. The theology of the church is now generally conservative and Reformed. A number of small Presbyterian denominations have arisen since the 1950s through migration or schism.

New Zealand

In New Zealand, Presbyterian is the dominant denomination in Otago and Southland due largely to the rich Scottish and to a lesser extent Ulster-Scots heritage in the region. The area around Christchurch, Canterbury, is dominated philosophically by the Anglican denomination.

Originally there were two branches of Presbyterianism in New Zealand, the northern Presbyterian church which existed in the North Island and the parts of the South Island north of the Waitaki River, and the Synod of Otago and Southland, founded by Free Church settlers in southern South Island. The two churches merged in 1901, forming what is now the Presbyterian Church of Aotearoa New Zealand.

In addition to the Presbyterian Church of Aotearoa New Zealand, there is also a more conservative Presbyterian church called Grace Presbyterian Church of New Zealand. Many of its members left the largely liberal PCANZ because they were seeking a more conservative church. It has 17 churches throughout New Zealand.

Vanuatu
The Presbyterian Church in Vanuatu is the largest denomination in the country, with approximately one-third of the population of Vanuatu members of the church. The PCV was taken to Vanuatu by missionaries from Scotland.  The PCV (Presbyterian Church of Vanuatu) is headed by a moderator with offices in Port Vila. The PCV is particularly strong in the provinces of Tafea, Shefa, and Malampa. The Province of Sanma is mainly Presbyterian with a strong Roman Catholic minority in the Francophone areas of the province. There are some Presbyterian people, but no organised Presbyterian churches in Penama and Torba, both of which are traditionally Anglican.  Vanuatu is the only country in the South Pacific with a significant Presbyterian heritage and membership. The PCV is a founding member of the Vanuatu Christian Council (VCC).  The PCV runs many primary schools and Onesua secondary school. The church is strong in the rural villages.

See also

 Celtic cross
 English Presbyterianism
 Fundamentalist–Modernist Controversy
 Ghost Ranch
 Puritan's Pit
 Presbyterian confessions of faith
 Religion in Scotland
 :Category:Presbyterian universities and colleges
 :Category:Presbyterians

Churches
 List of Christian denominations#Presbyterianism
 List of Presbyterian churches
 St Giles' Cathedral, Edinburgh (Church of Scotland) – famous among Presbyterians worldwide for John Knox's success in preaching there

References

Sources 

 Stewart J Brown. The National Churches of England, Ireland, and Scotland, 1801–46 (2001)
 William the Baptist by James M. Chaney (Reformed Presbyterian perspective on baptism and infant baptism)
 Jay E. Adams. The Meaning and Mode of Baptism Thomas Shepard. (1975) (Reformed Presbyterian perspective on Aspersion and Affusion)
 THE CHURCH MEMBERSHIP OF CHILDREN, AND THEIR RIGHT TO BAPTISM  (1662) (Reformed Presbyterian perspective on infants' right to church membership)
 William Henry Foote. Sketches of North Carolina, Historical and Biographical...(1846)  – full-text history of early North Carolina and its Presbyterian churches
 
 William Klempa, ed. The Burning Bush and a Few Acres of Snow: The Presbyterian Contribution to Canadian Life and Culture (1994)
 Marsden, George M. The Evangelical Mind and the New School Presbyterian Experience (1970)
 Mark A Noll. Princeton And The Republic, 1768–1822 (2004)
 Frank Joseph Smith, The History of the Presbyterian Church in America, Reformation Education Foundation, Manassas, VA 1985
 William Warren Sweet, Religion on the American Frontier, 1783—1840, vol. 2, The Presbyterians (1936), primary sources
 Ernest Trice Thompson. Presbyterians in the South vol 1: to 1860; Vol 2: 1861–1890; Vol 3: 1890–1972. (1963–1973)
 Leonard J. Trinterud, The Forming of an American Tradition: A Re-examination of Colonial Presbyterianism (1949)
 Encyclopedia of the Presbyterian Church in the United States of America (1884)
 St.Andrews Prebystarian church in Lahore, Pakistan.Church Website

Further reading

External links
 
 Presbyterian Heritage and History Center
 Presbyterian & Reformed Publishing

 
Christian terminology